Heros may refer to:

 plural of Hero (sandwich)
 Heros (fish), a genus of South American cichlids
 Heros, a 4th-century BC play by Menander
 Heros: The Sanguine Seven, a 1993 video game 
 Héros, 2013 album by French recording artist Eddy Mitchell
 H.E.R.O.S., 2017 album by French recording artist Shy'm
 Heros of Arles, early fifth century bishop
Heros the Spartan, an Eagle comic strip
 Heros Racing, a Japanese motor racing team 
 , the name of several ships

See also

 Hero (disambiguation)
 Hero, from the Greek  (hērōs)
 Heroes (disambiguation)
 Hero's, a Japanese mixed martial arts promotion
 Thracian Heros, a recurring motif of a horseman